Haji Abdul Zahir Qadeer is a member of parliament in Afghanistan.
He used to be a General in Afghanistan's Border Guard.

Zahir Qadeer is the son of Haji Abdul Qadeer a senior member of the anti-Taliban United Islamic Front (Northern Alliance), and one of the first Vice Presidents of the Afghan Transitional Administration. Zahir Qadeer's father was assassinated on 8 July 2002.

Zahir Qadeer and two other anti-Taliban leaders were freed from a Taliban prison in 1999 by Abdul-Razzaq Hekmati and Hekmatullah Hekmati, two former Mujahids who had served with the Taliban when they became disillusioned.

His family has long-standing ties with Mohammed Zahir Shah, the last king of Afghanistan.

On 30 August 2017, at least two security guards were killed in a suicide attack targeting his residence in Jalalabad.

References

Arsala family
Living people
Vice presidents of Afghanistan
Pashtun people
People from Nangarhar Province
Year of birth missing (living people)